The West Chester University Poetry Conference is an international poetry conference that has been held annually since 1995 at West Chester University, Pennsylvania, United States.  It hosts various panel discussions and poetry craft workshops, which focus primarily on formal poetry, narrative poetry, New Formalism and Expansive Poetry. It is the largest poetry-only conference in America and possibly the world as well as the only conference which focuses on traditional craft.

History
The conference was founded in 1995 by West Chester professor Michael Peich and poet Dana Gioia with 85 poets and scholars in attendance. The original core faculty members included Annie Finch, R. S. Gwynn, Mark Jarman, Robert McDowell, and Timothy Steele.  While some of these faculty still return regularly to teach, the faculty has expanded in recent years to include Kim Addonizio, Rhina Espaillat,  B. H. Fairchild, Rachel Hadas, Molly Peacock, Mary Jo Salter, A. E. Stallings, and many other widely published New Formalists.

Starting in 1999, the conference's program began including an art song concert.

In 2003, Gioia stepped down as co-director of the conference in order to become chairman of the National Endowment for the Arts.

The 2010 conference was the 16th and last year with Peich as director before he retired and passed the position to Kim Bridgford. By this time, the conference attendance had increased to 300 poets and poetry scholars. That year's concert of art song featured Natalie Merchant, who sung the poetry of various poets of the past. On June 12, the last day of the conference, the Queen's Birthday Honours 2010 were announced, including British comic poet Wendy Cope's appointment as an Officer of the Order of the British Empire.

R. S. Gwynn was named Program Director in September, 2015. His innovations included the initiation of a "Great Debates" series, the first of which, "Poetry or Verse?" was conducted by the poets James Matthew Wilson and Robert Archambeau.

Jesse Waters was named Program Director in January, 2018.

2020 saw no conference.

Awards given

Every year, the WCU Poetry Conference gives out three Iris N. Spencer Poetry Awards, the most notable one being the nationally-competitive Donald Justice Poetry Prize. The other two were given to recognize local regional undergraduate work in the Delaware Valley of Pennsylvania until 2012, when they were expanded to become nationally-competitive prizes.

Keynote speakers

1995 — Richard Wilbur
1996 — Donald Justice
1997 — Anthony Hecht
1998 — Wendy Cope
1999 — X. J. Kennedy
2000 — Louis Simpson
2001 — Marilyn Nelson
2002 — Nina Cassian
2003 — William Jay Smith
2004 — Dana Gioia
2005 — Anne Stevenson
2006 — James Fenton
2007 — Kay Ryan
2008 — Richard Wilbur

2009 — Donald Hall
2010 — Rhina Espaillat
2011 — Robert Pinsky
2012  Christian Wiman
2013  Julia Alvarez
2014  Natasha Trethewey
2016  Sir Andrew Motion
2017  A.E. Stallings
2018  Timothy Steele
2019  David Yezzi
2020  NONE

See also

 Mezzo Cammin, a journal of formalist poetry by women, associated with the WCU Poetry Conference
 Poetry
 American poetry
 List of years in poetry

External links

References

Poetry organizations
Cultural conferences
West Chester University
Annual events in Pennsylvania
Recurring events established in 1995
1995 establishments in Pennsylvania